Andrea Procaccini (14 January 1671 – 1734) was an Italian painter of the Baroque period, active in Rome as well as in Spain.

Biography
Procaccini was born in Rome.  He trained in the studio of Carlo Maratta. He painted the prophet Daniel for a series of twelve prophets made for San Giovanni Laterano.  He assisted in the establishment of the papal tapestry factory. He later moved to Spain where he painted for the royal family of Philip V for over a decade. He died at San Ildefonso.

References

1671 births
1734 deaths
Painters from Rome
17th-century Italian painters
Italian male painters
18th-century Italian painters
17th-century Spanish painters
Spanish male painters
18th-century Spanish painters
18th-century Spanish male artists
Italian Baroque painters
Pupils of Carlo Maratta
18th-century Italian male artists